Diri may refer to:
 Diri language, a language of Nigeria
 Douye Diri (born 1959), Nigerian politician
 Diri Baba, religious leader to whom the Diri Baba Mausoleum is dedicated

See also 
 Dirie